Jane Marnac, real name Jane Fernande Mayer, (8 February 1892 - 2 December 1976), was a Belgian stage and film actress.

She played hundred parts on stage and sung in numerous operettas and particularly Au temps des valses by Noël Coward in 1930 at the Apollo. In 1927, she married an English officer, major Keith Trevor.

Jane Marnac with her husband and Camille Wyn directed the Apollo in 1929 and 1930.

She took part to several films, including The Darling of Paris with Jean Gabin.

Her remains are in the columbarium of the Père Lachaise cemetery (case 17 787).

Theatre 
 1912 : Paris fin de règne de Rip, Théâtre des Capucines
 1912 : Le Malade imaginaire by Molière, directed by André Antoine, théâtre Antoine
 1913 : Le Procureur Hallers by Louis Forest  Henry de Gorsse after Paul Lindau, mise en scène Firmin Gémier, théâtre Antoine
 1914 : La Fille de Figaro by Maurice Hennequin and Hugues Delorme, music Xavier Leroux, théâtre de l'Apollo
 1916 : Monsieur chasse ! by Georges Feydeau, théâtre de la Renaissance
 1916 : All Right revue by Rip, théâtre Édouard VII
 1918 : La Reine joyeuse (nouveau titre de La Reine s'amuse) operetta by André Barde, music Charles Cuvillier, Apollo  
 1918 : L'École des cocottes by Paul Armont and Marcel Gerbidon, théâtre du Grand-Guignol
 1919 : L'École des cocottes by Paul Armont and Marcel Gerbidon, théâtre Michel
 1919 : La Chasse à l'homme by Maurice Donnay, théâtre des Variétés
 1922 : La Belle Angevine by Maurice Donnay and André Rivoire, théâtre des Variétés
 1922 : La Petite Chocolatière by Paul Gavault, théâtre des Variétés
 1922 : Le Blanc et le noir by Sacha Guitry, théâtre des Variétés
 1923 : L'École des cocottes by Paul Armont and Marcel Gerbidon, théâtre du Palais-Royal 
 1923 : Un jour de folie by André Birabeau, théâtre des Variétés
 1928 : La Revue de Marigny revue de Jean Le Seyeux and Saint-Granier, théâtre Marigny
 1929 : Shangaï by Charles Méré after John Colton, théâtre de l'Apollo
 1929 : Dans la rue by Elmer Rice, adaptation Francis Carco, directed by Pierre Geoffroy, Apollo
 1930 : Au temps des valses by Noël Coward, adaptation Saint-Granier, Apollo
 1938 : Femmes by Clare Boothe, adaptation Jacques Deval, directed by Jane Marnac, théâtre Pigalle

Filmography 

 1911 : The Hunchback of Notre Dame by Albert Capellani - short film -
 1914 : La Goualeuse by Alexandre Deverennes - La goualeuse
 1915 : Le baromètre de la fidélité by Georges Monca - short film -
 1916 : Notre pauvre cœur by Louis Feuillade
 1916  : Paris pendant la guerre by Henri Diamant-Berger
 1931 : The Darling of Paris by Augusto Genina - Jane Diamond

Belgian stage actresses
Belgian film actresses
Belgian silent film actresses
20th-century Belgian actresses
Actresses from Brussels
1892 births
1976 deaths
Burials at Père Lachaise Cemetery